Salem is an unincorporated community in Oconee County, in the U.S. state of Georgia.

History
The Georgia General Assembly incorporated Salem as a town in 1818. Salem no longer is incorporated. A later variant name was "Candy". A post office called Candy was in operation from 1898 until 1903.

References

Former municipalities in Georgia (U.S. state)
Unincorporated communities in Georgia (U.S. state)
Unincorporated communities in Oconee County, Georgia